The Far East Command was a military regional division of the British military, United States military and Soviet Armed Forces

 British Far East Command
 Far East Command (United States) was a United States military command from 1947 until 1957
 Far East Command (Soviet Union), a command created in 1945 specifically for the Soviet invasion of Manchuria, should not to be confused with the Far Eastern Military District

See also
 American-British-Dutch-Australian Command (ABDACOM)
 South East Asia Command (SEAC)